Little Black Classics are a series of short books published by Penguin Books, the series consists of complete or extracts from books considered to be classics. Penguin Books has published 127 in total.

Books

00. Penguin Classics: Catalogue
01. Mrs Rosie and the Priest - Giovanni Boccaccio
02. As kingfishers catch fire - Gerard Manley Hopkins
03. The Saga of Gunnlaug Serpent-tongue - Anon
04. On Murder Considered as One of the Fine Arts - Thomas De Quincey
05. Aphorisms on Love and Hate - Friedrich Nietzsche
06. Traffic - John Ruskin
07. Wailing Ghosts - Pu Songling
08. A Modest Proposal - Jonathan Swift
09. Three Tang Dynasty Poets - Anon
10. On the Beach at Night Alone - Walt Whitman
11. A Cup of Sake Beneath the Cherry Trees - Kenkō
12. How to Use Your Enemies - Baltasar Gracián
13. The Eve of St Agnes - John Keats
14. Woman Much Missed - Thomas Hardy
15. Femme Fatale - Guy de Maupassant
16. Travels in the Land of Serpents and Pearls - Marco Polo
17. Caligula - Suetonius
18. Jason and Medea - Apollonius of Rhodes
19. Olalla - Robert Louis Stevenson
20. The Communist Manifesto - Karl Marx and Friedrich Engels
21. Trimalchio's Feast - Petronius
22. How a Ghastly Story Was Brought to Light - Johann Peter Hebel
23. The Tinder Box - Hans Christian Andersen
24. The Gate of the Hundred Sorrows - Rudyard Kipling
25. Circles of Hell - Dante
26. Of Street Piemen - Henry Mayhew
27. The nightingales are drunk - Hafez
28. The Wife of Bath - Geoffrey Chaucer
29. How We Weep and Laugh at the Same Thing - Michel de Montaigne
30. The Terrors of the Night - Thomas Nashe
31. The Tell-Tale Heart - Edgar Allan Poe
32. A Hippo Banquet - Mary Kingsley
33. The Beautifull Cassandra - Jane Austen
34. Gooseberries - Anton Chekhov
35. Well, they are gone, and here must I remain - Samuel Taylor Coleridge
36. Sketchy, Doubtful, Incomplete Jottings - Johann Wolfgang von Goethe
37. The Great Winglebury Duel - Charles Dickens
38. The Maldive Shark - Herman Melville
39. The Old Nurse’s Story - Elizabeth Gaskell
40. The Steel Flea - Nikolay Leskov
41. The Atheist’s Mass - Honoré de Balzac
42. The Yellow Wall-Paper - Charlotte Perkins Gilman
43. Remember, Body... - C.P. Cavafy
44. The Meek One - Fyodor Dostoevsky
45. A Simple Heart - Gustave Flaubert
46. The Nose - Gogol
47. The Great Fire of London - Samuel Pepys
48. The Reckoning - Edith Wharton
49. The Figure in the Carpet - Henry James
50. Anthem for Doomed Youth - Wilfred Owen
51. My Dearest Father - Wolfgang Amadeus Mozart
52. Socrates’ Defence - Plato
53. Goblin Market - Christina Rossetti
54. Sindbad the Sailor - Anon
55. Antigone - Sophocles
56. The Life of a Stupid Man - Ryūnosuke Akutagawa
57. How Much Land Does a Man Need? - Leo Tolstoy
58. Leonardo da Vinci - Giorgio Vasari
59. Lord Arthur Savile’s Crime - Oscar Wilde
60. The Old Man of the Moon - Shen Fu
61. The Dolphins, the Whales and the Gudgeon - Aesop
62. Lips too chilled - Matsuo Bashō
63. The Night is Darkening Round Me - Emily Brontë
64. To-morrow - Joseph Conrad
65. The Voyage of Sir Francis Drake Around the Whole Globe - Richard Hakluyt
66. A Pair of Silk Stockings - Kate Chopin
67. It was snowing butterflies - Charles Darwin
68. The Robber Bridegroom - Brothers Grimm
69. I Hate and I Love - Catullus
70. Circe and the Cyclops - Homer
71. Il Duro - D. H. Lawrence
72. Miss Brill - Katherine Mansfield
73. The Fall of Icarus - Ovid
74. Come Close - Sappho
75. Kasyan from the Beautiful Lands - Ivan Turgenev
76. O Cruel Alexis - Virgil
77. A Slip under the Microscope - H. G. Wells
78. The Madness of Cambyses - Herodotus
79. Speaking of Śiva - Anon
80. The Dhammapada - Anon
81. Lady Susan - Jane Austen
82. The Body Politic - Jean-Jacques Rousseau
83. The World is Full of Foolish Men - Jean de la Fontaine
84. The Sea Raiders - H.G. Wells
85. Hannibal - Livy
86. To Be Read at Dusk - Charles Dickens
87. The Death of Ivan Ilyich - Leo Tolstoy
88. The Stolen White Elephant - Mark Twain
89. Tyger, Tyger - William Blake
90. Green Tea - Sheridan Le Fanu
91. The Yellow Book - Various
92. Kidnapped - Olaudah Equiano
93. A Modern Detective - Edgar Allan Poe
94. The Suffragettes - Various
95. How To Be a Medieval Woman - Margery Kempe
96. Typhoon - Joseph Conrad
97. The Nun of Murano - Giacomo Casanova
98. A terrible beauty is born - W.B. Yeats
99. The Withered Arm - Thomas Hardy
100. Nonsense - Edward Lear
101. The Frogs - Aristophanes
102. Why I Am so Clever - Friedrich Nietzsche
103. Letters to a Young Poet - Rainer Maria Rilke
104. Seven Hanged - Leonid Andreyev
105. Oroonoko - Aphra Behn
106. O frabjous day! - Lewis Carroll
107. Trivia: or, the Art of Walking the Streets of London - John Gay
108. The Sandman - E. T. A. Hoffmann
109. Love that moves the sun and other stars - Dante
110. The Queen of Spades - Alexander Pushkin
111. A Nervous Breakdown - Anton Chekhov
112. The Book of Tea - Kakuzo Okakura
113. Is this a dagger which I see before me? - William Shakespeare
114. My life had stood a loaded gun - Emily Dickinson
115. Daphnis and Chloe - Longus
116. Matilda - Mary Shelley
117. The Lifted Veil - George Eliot
118. White Nights - Fyodor Dostoyevsky
119. Only Dull People Are Brilliant at Breakfast - Oscar Wilde
120. Flush - Virginia Woolf
121. Lot No. 249 - Arthur Conan Doyle
122. The Rule of Benedict - Benedict of Nursia
123. Rip Van Winkle - Washington Irving
124. Anecdotes of the Cynics - Anon
125. Waterloo -  Victor Hugo
126. Stancliffe’s Hotel - Charlotte Brontë
127. The Constitution of the United States - Founding Fathers

See also 
Penguin Modern (series to mark the 50th anniversary of Penguin Modern Classics)

References

External links
 Publisher site

Lists of books
Penguin Books book series
Series of non-fiction books
Classical literature
Literature by language
Penguin Books